Olfe may refer to:

Olfe (Nuhne), a river of Hesse and North Rhine-Westphalia, Germany, tributary of the Nuhne
Olfe (Werse), a river of North Rhine-Westphalia, Germany, tributary of the Werse